Ludger Kühnhardt (born 4 June 1958) is a German political scientist, born in Münster. Since 1997 he has been Director at the Center for European Integration Studies (ZEI), which he helped to found, and Professor of Political Science at Bonn University.

Education
After studies of history, philosophy and political science at Bonn, Geneva, Tokyo and Harvard, Kühnhardt wrote a dissertation on the world refugee problem (1983) and a second thesis (Habilitation) on the universality of human rights (1986). He was a student of Karl Dietrich Bracher.

Career
Between 1991 and 1997 Kühnhardt was Professor of Political Science at Freiburg University, where he also served as Dean of his Faculty. He was speechwriter for Germany's Federal President Richard von Weizsäcker (1987–1989) and a visiting professor at prestigious universities around the world, including the University of Cape Town (1991), College of Europe (1995), Dartmouth College (2000), Stanford University (2004), Seoul National University (2004–2005), St Antony's College, Oxford (2005–2006), Canterbury University, Christchurch (2015) and Tongji University Shanghai (2016).

Kühnhardt regularly lectures at the Catholic University of Milan (since 1997), at the Diplomatic Academy of Vienna (since 2002) and at the Mediterranean Academy of Diplomatic Studies MEDAC in Malta (since 2007).  He was a visiting scholar at the Institute for Human Sciences, Vienna (1993) and a public policy scholar at the Woodrow Wilson International Center for Scholars in Washington, D.C. (2002 and 2011). Kühnhardt has intensive political and academic consulting experience, including for the secretary general of the Council of Europe and for the president of the European Parliament. He is a member of the Advisory Board for Societal Affairs of the German Bishop's Conference, a member of the scientific committee of the West Africa Institute (WAI), a member of the governing board of the European Humanities University, Vilnius, and a member of the advisory board of OMFIF. Kühnhardt has lectured on all continents. In 2004 he was awarded the European Science Prize of the European Cultural Foundation.

Bibliography
Among more than thirty books, his publications include:
 Constituting Europe, Baden-Baden 2003
 European Union – The Second Founding. The Changing Rationale of European Integration, Baden-Baden 2008 (2nd.revised edition 2010)
 Crises in European Integration. Challenges and Responses, 1945–2005, New York/Oxford 2009
 Region Building (2 volumes), New York/Oxford 2010.
 Africa Consensus: New Interests, Initiatives and Partners, Washington D.C./Baltimore 2014
 Bonner Enzyklopädie der Globalität (2 volumes, edited with Tilman Mayer), Wiesbaden 2017 (english edition: The Bonn Handbook of Globality (2 volumes, edited with Tilman Mayer), Cham 2019.
 The Global Society and Its Enemies: Liberal Order Beyond the Third World War, Cham 2017.

References

External links
 Center for European Integration Studies

German political scientists
Academic staff of the College of Europe
Living people
1958 births